Aghkand-e Qareh Khezer (also Romanized as Āgh Kand-e Qareh Kheẕer; also known as Āqkand-e Qareh Kheẕer) is a village in Leylan-e Jonubi Rural District, Leylan District, Malekan County, East Azerbaijan Province, Iran. At the 2006 census, its population was 540, in 129 families.

References 

Populated places in Malekan County